As a prominent American landmark, the Golden Gate Bridge has been used in a variety of media, often shown or mentioned where San Francisco, California is the setting of the story.

Films

Destroyed
The Golden Gate Bridge has been destroyed in the following films.
 It Came from Beneath the Sea (1955): Destroyed by a giant octopus.
 Battle in Outer Space (1959): Destroyed by a meteor from space.
 Superman (1978): Partially destroyed by an earthquake.
 The Core (2003): Destroyed by unfiltered solar radiation from the Sun.
 10.5 (2004): Destroyed by a major earthquake.
 X-Men: The Last Stand (2006): Destroyed and moved to Alcatraz by Magneto, one of X-Men's villains. Shown to be rebuilt at the end.
 Mega Shark Versus Giant Octopus (2009): Destroyed by a giant monster attack.
 Monsters vs. Aliens (2009): During a battle with the probe, it topples over onto the span, resulting in the south tower's collapse.
 Meteor Storm (2010): Destroyed by a meteor shower.
 Pacific Rim (2013):  Destroyed by a giant kaiju.
 Godzilla (2014): Destroyed by Godzilla after it cuts through the span.
 San Andreas (2015): A mega-tsunami carrying a cargo ship hits the bridge, causing it to collapse.
 Terminator Genisys (2015): Destroyed by a nuclear missile.
 Sharknado 5: Global Swarming (2017):  Destroyed by a Sharknado worldwide.

Other appearances
It has featured also in the following movies.
The Maltese Falcon (1941)
Dark Passage (1947)
Vertigo (1958)
The Love Bug (1968): The bridge is seen when Herbie is about to launch himself off the bridge.
Herbie Rides Again (1974): The bridge is seen on certain scenes.
Star Trek: The Motion Picture (1979): Seen in 2273, the bridge has been converted into a tram system leading to the Presidio, where Starfleet headquarters is located.
 An Eye for an Eye 1981 film starring Chuck Norris. The bridge can be seen when Norris drives his car through it.
National Lampoon's Vacation (1983) - seen as one of the postcards in the opening credits.
A View to a Kill (1985): Zorin (antagonist) attempts to kill Bond (protagonist), who is hanging from one of the mooring ropes of an airship, by smashing him into the top of the bridge.  Bond manages to secure the airship to the bridge, and a fist-fight at the top of the bridge ensues.
Star Trek IV: The Voyage Home (1986): The bridge is almost hit by Admiral Kirk's out of control Klingon Bird of Prey.
Flight of the Navigator (1986): David flies the Trimaxion Drone Ship under the bridge.
The Abyss (1989): The bridge is missed
Interview with the Vampire (1994): Lestat de Lioncourt drives over the bridge.
Homeward Bound II: Lost in San Francisco (1996): The Seavor family drives across the bridge to go to San Francisco International Airport. The pets later cross the bridge on their way home.
 Bicentennial Man (1999): Seen expanded in the future (circa 2200s) with a two-tiered roadway added.
Hulk (2003)
Land of the Lost (2009)
Star Trek (2009) - In an alternate 2258, the Narada's damaged drill almost hits the bridge.
Mission: Impossible – Ghost Protocol (2011): The bridge is missed.
Rise of the Planet of the Apes (2011): The bridge is hit and disrupted traffic, but not destroyed.
Big Hero 6 (2014)
Inside Out (2015): Riley Anderson and her family drive across the bridge as they move into San Francisco.
Sharknado: The 4th Awakens (2016)
Bumblebee (2018): The bridge is seen when Charlie and Bumblebee arrive on a cliff overlooking the bridge.
Beautiful Boy (2018): The bridge is seen in a scene where Nick stops the car and calls his sponsor.
Avengers: Endgame (2019): The bridge is seen near a memorial of victims of the Blip
Sonic the Hedgehog (2020): The bridge is seen 4 times.
The Mitchells vs. the Machines (2021): The bridge is seen when the PAL Max robots invade San Francisco.

Television
It has also been featured in the opening/closing and/or episodes of the following shows.
10.5
Charmed
Falcon Crest
Full House (including its sequel, Fuller House)
Futurama
Hotel
Love is a Many Splendored Thing
Monk
My Sister Sam
Nash Bridges
Phyllis
Raven's Home
Star Trek PicardSuddenly SusanThat's So RavenToo Close for ComfortWe Bare BearsDocumentaries
It has been the subject of a 2006 documentary and a 2008-2010 documentary TV series:
 The Bridge – a film about suicides from Golden Gate Bridge in 2004.Life After People - A TV documentary series about what happens to the world if humanity suddenly disappears; the Golden Gate Bridge collapses after around 100 years due to corrosion in its support cables. After 200 years, only the towers remain intact.

Video games

The bridge appeared in the 2000 video game Midtown Madness 2.
 
The bridge is replicated in the 2004 video game Grand Theft Auto: San Andreas which is itself heavily based on San Francisco, Los Angeles and Las Vegas. There it is known as the "Gant Bridge".

In Call of Duty: Advanced Warfare, the bridge is destroyed in the "Collapse" campaign mission after Atlas attach drones to the cables and detonate them.

The 2011 game Driver: San Francisco, as its name implies, is set in San Francisco. It also features many missions modelled after famous movie car chases including one from Gone in 60 Seconds which ends at the Golden Gate Bridge.

In Call of Duty: Black Ops 2 Zombies, the bridge also appeared when the zombies crew crashed into the bridge while escaping from Alcatraz.

In Watch Dogs 2, the bridge appears in the game as it is set in the San Francisco Bay Area. In a side mission in the game, the character will paint graffiti on the Bridge.
 
The Golden Gate Bridge also appeared in several SCS games like 18 Wheels of Steel series and American Truck Simulator as part of the game world.

The bridge is a buildable wonder in the Civilization VI expansion Gathering Storm, marking its debut in the longstanding strategy series.

Other
 KRON-TV, the former NBC/My Network TV affiliate used an animated version of the Golden Gate Bridge as their legal ID in the 1970s and 1980s.
 NORAD Tracks Santa, the Golden Gate Bridge was a featured Santa Cam location for the 2002 tracking season.
 A small-scale replica of the bridge was previously used at the main entry point of Disney's California Adventure Park in Anaheim, California.  The replica was replaced in the early 2010s by a small-scale model of the Glendale-Hyperion Bridge as part of the entrance plaza's transformation into a re-creation of Los Angeles' Buena Vista Street.
 In the Sliders episode "Post Traumatic Slide Syndrome", the Golden Gate Bridge is blue, which is how Wade finds out the Earth they have landed on is not Earth Prime.
In the Star Trek: Deep Space Nine episode "The Changing Face of Evil", set in 2375, the Golden Gate Bridge is damaged in a Breen attack on Starfleet Headquarters. It is shown to have been repaired in the Star Trek: Voyager'' episode "Pathfinder", set in 2376.

References

Popular culture
San Francisco in popular culture